Inman Nunatak is a nunatak standing  east of Mount Manthe in the southeastern part of the Hudson Mountains, Antarctica. It was mapped by the United States Geological Survey from surveys and U.S. Navy air photos, 1960–66, and was named by the Advisory Committee on Antarctic Names for Martin M. Inman, an auroral scientist at Byrd Station in the 1960–61 and 1961–62 seasons.

References

Hudson Mountains
Nunataks of Ellsworth Land
Volcanoes of Ellsworth Land